USS D-2 (SS-18) was a D-class submarine of the United States Navy. Her keel was laid down by Fore River Shipbuilding Company in Quincy, Massachusetts, under a subcontract from Electric Boat Company of Groton, Connecticut, as Grayling, making her the first ship of the U.S. Navy to be named for the Arctic grayling, a fresh-water game fish closely related to the trout. Grayling was launched on 16 June 1909, sponsored by Miss C. H. Bowles, and commissioned on 23 November 1909. She was renamed D-2 on 17 November 1911.

Service history
D-2 joined the Atlantic Torpedo Fleet as Flagboat for Submarine Division 3 (SubDiv 3). Along the United States East Coast, D-2 joined in diving, torpedo, and experimental exercises. She participated in the Presidential Review of the Fleet in the North River at New York City from 5 to 18 May 1915.

While patrolling outside Naval Station Newport, Rhode Island, just three nautical miles east of Point Judith shortly before 14:00 on 7 October 1916, D-2 discovered the Imperial German Navy submarine  under the command of Hans Rose heading towards Newport, Rhode Island, as part of her hitherto unprecedented two-way traversal of the Atlantic Ocean without refueling or resupply. The United States was still neutral in World War I, but there was an initial flurry of activity when U-53 suddenly steamed away to port believing the submerged D-2 to be a British submarine, but when D-2 surfaced so that a crewman could run aft to raise the United States flag, U-53 slowed. Lieutenant G. C. Fulker, USN, commanding officer of D-2, brought his submarine up close to U-53 on a parallel course to escort U-53 while in sight of land. As the submarines reached the Brenton Reef Lightship, Rose requested permission from D-2 to enter port at Newport. Fulker granted it, and Rose called back by megaphone, "I salute our American comrades and follow in your wake."

After the United States entered World War I on the side of the Allies on 6 April 1917, D-2 served in training and experimental work at New London, Connecticut. On 31 July 1917 or 1 August 1917 she sank Schooner Charlotte W. Miller in a collision near Bartletts Reef near New London, Connecticut. Miller was later raised but declared a total loss. On 14 September 1917 she sank at pierside with all hands aboard, although her entire crew was rescued. She was refloated, repaired, and returned to service.

D-2 was placed in commission, in reserve, at the Philadelphia Navy Yard in Philadelphia, Pennsylvania, on 9 September 1919 and placed in ordinary on 15 July 1921. She was decommissioned on 18 January 1922 and sold as a hulk on 25 September 1922.

References

External links

United States D-class submarines
World War I submarines of the United States
Ships built in Quincy, Massachusetts
1909 ships
Maritime incidents in 1917
United States submarine accidents